Zabrachia magnicornis is a species of soldier fly in the family Stratiomyidae.

References

Stratiomyidae
Insects described in 1919
Taxa named by Ezra Townsend Cresson
Diptera of North America